Tex Rides with the Boy Scouts is a 1937 American Western film directed by Ray Taylor and starring singing cowboy Tex Ritter and Troop 13 Los Angeles District Boy Scouts of America. The film was shot in Old Kernville, California and premiered on Broadway in November 1937.

Plot
The film opens with a tribute to the Boy Scouts of America with footage of their first Jamboree in Washington D.C. and an appearance by Robert Baden-Powell.

The scene switches to the robbery of a train carrying $1,000,000 in gold by a gang of outlaws, who hide out at an abandoned gold mine before they attempt to take the gold across the border into Mexico. Tex Ritter and his two sidekicks are warned off from the mine, but join the nearby camp of a troop of Boy Scouts who are impressed when Tex informs them that he was a Boy Scout and shows them his Silver Beaver Award. Tex and his sidekicks investigate the robbery, then, helped by the Scouts, recovers the gold and brings the gang to justice.

Cast 
Tex Ritter ... Tex Collins
Forrest Taylor 	... Dorman
Marjorie Reynolds 	... Norma Willis
Horace Murphy 	... Stubby
Snub Pollard 	... Pee Wee
Tommy Bupp 	... 	Buzzy Willis
Charles King 	... 	Bert Stark
Karl Hackett ... 	Newt Kemp
Lynton Brent 	...  Pete
Philip Ahn 	... 	Sing Fung
The Beverly Hillbillies ... Themselves
Members of Troop 13 Los Angeles District Boy Scouts of America 	... Themselves

Soundtrack 
 Red River Valley
Performed by the Beverly Hillbillies
 I'm Headin' For My Texas Home
Sung by Tex Ritter
 The Gal I Left Behind Me
Sung by Tex Ritter with the Beverly Hillbillies

See also
 Drum Taps

Notes

External links 
 

1937 films
American black-and-white films
1937 Western (genre) films
Grand National Films films
American Western (genre) films
Boy Scouts of America
Films about the Boy Scouts of America
Films directed by Ray Taylor
1930s English-language films
1930s American films